Each chapter in Zeta Psi has a unique name composed of one or two Greek letters. A colony petitioning Zeta Psi to become a chapter chooses a name for its chapter upon receiving its charter. From this point on, the name is fixed. Even if the chapter goes inactive—in that it has no undergraduate members—the name will be taken up by any group that re-establishes a chapter at the university campus.

The name can be based on many different factors. For instance, it is common for new chapters to take on an element from an existent chapter that has helped them form. Theta Xi chapter in Toronto adopted the Xi from their neighbor chapter in Michigan. In turn, every chapter in Ontario has a "Theta" as part of their name from their relationship to the Toronto chapter. Other times, a name is related to other factors like the Roman Catholic Villanova University chapter being named Alpha Omega chapter due to the Christian significance.

A one or two-letter name can only be re-used if the chapter possessing the name is pronounced "deceased." This has not happened since 1892.

Chapters 
Inactive Chapters are those either recently inactive or those which are planned for eventual reorganization. 
Deceased chapters are generally, long dormant chapters. Some may have been restored on the same campus under a new name.

Explanatory notes

References 

chapters
Lists of chapters of United States student societies by society